Forged endorsement is a type of fraudulent payment. For example, someone may write a cheque with a forged signature. In this case the forged signature makes the endorsement fraudulent. Forging endorsements can be used to prevent the person or legal entity that the payment is made out to from being able to receive its value (such as cashing a cheque).

Legal description

If an instrument is endorsed in full, it cannot be endorsed or negotiated except by an endorsement signed by the person to whom or to whose order the instrument is payable. Thus, if such an instrument is negotiated by way of a forged endorsement, the endorsee will not acquire the title even though he be a purchaser for value and in good faith, because the endorsement is nullity. But where the instrument has been endorsed in blank, it can be negotiated by mere delivery and the holder derives his title independent of the forged endorsement and can claim the amount from any of the parties to the instrument.

Examples
A bill is endorsed, “payable to X or order”. X endorses it in blank and it comes into the hands of Y, who simply delivers it to A. A would then forge Y's endorsement and transfers it to B. B, as the holder, does not derive his title through the forged endorsement to Y, but through the genuine endorsement of X and can claim payment from any of the parties to the instrument in spite of the intervening forged endorsement.

References

Securities (finance)
Legal documents
Legal terminology
Cheques
Negotiable instrument law
Business law
Accounting source documents
Forgery